Alicia Lagano is an American actress. She is perhaps best known for her role as Cristina Castelli on the NBC Saturday morning series All About Us (2001) and Selena on the Lifetime television drama The Client List (2012–13).

Early life and education
Lagano was born Brooklyn, New York. She is of Italian and Irish descent. At age ten, Lagano moved to Portland, Oregon. She later attended Beaverton High School before graduating from Wilson High School in 1997. She then moved to Los Angeles, California to pursue an acting career.

Career
In addition to her appearance in All About Us, some of her other television acting credits include ER, Bones, Judging Amy, Without a Trace, Lie to Me, CSI: Crime Scene Investigation, Dexter (two episodes as Nikki Wald; 2009) and Prison Break (two episodes as Agatha Warren; 2009). In 2011, she was cast as Selena in Lifetime television drama The Client List, starring Jennifer Love Hewitt.

Filmography

References

External links

20th-century American actresses
21st-century American actresses
Actresses from New York City
Actresses from Portland, Oregon
American film actresses
American people of British descent
American people of Italian descent
American television actresses
Beaverton High School alumni
Living people
People from Brooklyn
Ida B. Wells-Barnett High School alumni
Year of birth missing (living people)